Chemosh refers to more than one thing:

 For the biblical God of the Moabites, see Chemosh
 For the Dragonlance God, see Chemosh (Dragonlance)